Zhao Lina (born September 18, 1991) is a Chinese footballer who plays as a goalkeeper for the Chinese national team.

International career
In April 2015, Zhao Lina was called up to play for team China in the 2015 FIFA Women's World Cup.

References

External links
 Zhao Lina profile fifa.com
 

1991 births
Living people
Women's association football goalkeepers
2015 FIFA Women's World Cup players
Footballers at the 2016 Summer Olympics
Olympic footballers of China
China women's international footballers
Chinese women's footballers
Footballers at the 2018 Asian Games
Asian Games silver medalists for China
Asian Games medalists in football
Medalists at the 2018 Asian Games